Klaus Bockisch (5 December 1938 – 18 November 2018) was a German professional football player and coach.

Career
Born in Upper Silesia, Bockisch began his career with Lüner SV before moving to SC Preußen Münster in 1959. He played for them in the inaugural season of the Bundesliga, making 30 appearances, and later played for FC 08 Villingen, whom he later also coached. He also coached BSV 07 Schwenningen, FV St. Georgen and FC Klengen.

Later life and death
Bockisch was married with a daughter, and lived in the village of Villingen. He died in hospital in Donaueschingen on 18 November 2018, aged 79.

References

External links
 

1938 births
2018 deaths
German footballers
Association football defenders
Bundesliga players
SC Preußen Münster players
FC 08 Villingen players
German football managers
BSV 07 Schwenningen managers